Azahara may refer to:

 a palace in Falset, Tarragona, Spain
 Azahara Muñoz (born 1987), Spanish professional golfer
 Medina Azahara, the ruins of an Arab Muslim medieval palace in Córdoba, Spain